Arts College railway station is a railway station in Secunderabad, Telangana, India. Localities like Osmania University, Habsiguda, Warasiguda and Adikmet are accessible from this station.

Lines
Hyderabad Multi-Modal Transport System
Secunderabad–Falaknuma route (SF Line)

References

MMTS stations in Hyderabad
Hyderabad railway division